"Walk Out Backwards" is a song written and recorded by American country singer-songwriter Bill Anderson. It was released as a single in October 1960 via Decca Records and became a major hit.

Background and release
"Walk Out Backwards" was recorded in September 1960 at the Bradley Studio, located in Nashville, Tennessee. The sessions were produced by Owen Bradley, who would serve as Anderson's producer through most of years with Decca Records.

"Walk Out Backwards" was released as a single by Decca Records in October 1960. It spent a total of 14 weeks on the Billboard Hot Country and Western Sides chart before reaching number 9 in February 1960. It was Anderson's first top ten hit as a recording artist. The song was not issued on a proper album following its release.

Track listings
7" vinyl single
 "Walk Out Backwards" – 2:27
 "The Best of Strangers" – 1:57

Chart performance

References

1960 singles
1960 songs
Bill Anderson (singer) songs
Decca Records singles
Song recordings produced by Owen Bradley
Songs written by Bill Anderson (singer)